is a Japanese former alpine skier who competed in the 1988 Winter Olympics, and 1992 Winter Olympics.

External links
 
 

1965 births
People from Otaru
Sportspeople from Hokkaido
Living people
Japanese male alpine skiers
Olympic alpine skiers of Japan
Alpine skiers at the 1988 Winter Olympics
Alpine skiers at the 1992 Winter Olympics
Alpine skiers at the 1994 Winter Olympics
Asian Games medalists in alpine skiing
Asian Games gold medalists for Japan
Alpine skiers at the 1986 Asian Winter Games
Medalists at the 1986 Asian Winter Games
20th-century Japanese people